"Pardon Me" is a song by American rock band Incubus. Released in October 1999 as the lead single from their third album Make Yourself, it was the band's first song to receive considerable radio airplay, reaching number three on the Billboard Modern Rock Tracks chart and number seven on the Mainstream Rock Tracks chart and number 2 on Bubbling Under Hot 100 Singles chart.

Background and writing
In an interview, lead singer Brandon Boyd explained the song's origins, "I was in a bookstore, browsing through an old Life magazine, when I saw a picture of what the article called spontaneous human combustion. There were an old guy's legs and shoes, perfectly intact - then, right around his knee area, was just a pile of charred ashes. I was going through some turmoil in my life, both good and bad, and the image struck a chord, so I wrote a song about it." Boyd had recently returned from a tour to find out that his girlfriend of 7 years had been cheating on him, and that both his grandmother and a close friend of his had died.  After seeing a picture in Life magazine of a man who had spontaneously combusted, he related the man's problems to his own and was inspired to write the lyric "Pardon me while I burst into flames" on his hand.

Music video
The music video for "Pardon Me", directed by Steven Murashige, also gained considerable airplay. The video begins with Brandon Boyd and his father Charles, at opposite ends of a hallway.  As the two approach each other, Charles begins to regress in age and appearance, while Boyd begins to grow more elderly, becoming increasingly alike as they advance toward each other. When they meet, they pass through each other and continue on in opposite directions. Footage of the band members in white outfits (except for Boyd, who is shirtless) in a red-colored box are also shown, as is footage of the band members in red outfits being surrounded by businessmen and businesswomen.

The video premiered on The Box the week ending on January 16, 2000.

Track listing
US single
 "Pardon Me" (Album Version)
 "Crowded Elevator"
 "Pardon Me" (Acoustic)
 "Drive" (Acoustic)

US promotional single
 "Pardon Me" (Acoustic)

UK single
 "Pardon Me" (Album Version)
 "I Miss You" (Acoustic)
 "Crowded Elevator"

In popular culture
"Pardon Me" was released as downloadable content for Rock Band 3. The song was played during the credits of an episode from the fourth season of Daria. The song also appeared in the film Little Nicky starring Adam Sandler.

It was also used in the Newgrounds classic game Pick the Path, where it is the only song Fiore, the main character, will listen to.

In YouTube, "The AGK Series" made by Bryan Bay used "Pardon Me" as the intro of the song.

Charts

Personnel
Incubus
Brandon Boyd - vocals
Mike Einziger - guitar
Dirk Lance - bass
José Pasillas - drums
Chris Kilmore - turntables
Production
Produced by Scott Litt

Release history

References

External links

2000 singles
Incubus (band) songs
Song recordings produced by Scott Litt
1999 songs
Epic Records singles
Immortal Records singles
Songs written by Brandon Boyd
Songs written by Mike Einziger
Songs written by Alex Katunich
Songs written by Chris Kilmore
Songs written by José Pasillas